Ostermiething is a municipality in the district of Braunau am Inn in the Austrian state of Upper Austria.

Geography
Ostermiething lies in the upper Innviertel on the western edge of the Weilhart forest directly across the Salzach from Germany. There is a bridge to the Bavarian town of Tittmoning.

People 
 Werner Gruber (born 1970), Austrian physicist, author, professor

References

Cities and towns in Braunau am Inn District